The ObZen World Tour was a concert tour by Swedish extreme metal band Meshuggah, in support of the band's sixth studio album obZen. 

It is the biggest tour the band has done to date; and the band travelled to places around the world they had previously not performed in. In 2009, Meshuggah returned to North America on a tour with Cynic and The Faceless.

The Alive concert film was produced during the tour.

History
In 2007, Meshuggah returned to the studio to record their latest album, obZen, which was released in March 2008. The band spent almost a year on the album; their longest recording session yet. A significant portion of the year was spent learning to perform the songs they wrote; the recording itself took six months. obZen reached number 59 on the Billboard Top 200 chart and sold 11,400 copies in the United States in its first week of release, and 50,000 copies after six months. With this album Meshuggah got more media attention and new fans. The release was followed by a world tour, which started in the US and proceeded to Europe, Asia and Australia.

Song debuts
In the first North American leg, three new songs from the new album were slated into the band's setlist: Electric Red, Bleed and Pravus.
In the 2009 North American leg, Meshuggah debuted a full live version of the song Bleed. Up until then, live shows featured a shorter version, one similar to the video edit of the song. This leg also saw the debuts of the songs Combustion and Lethargica, also from the obZen album.

Typical setlist
Taken from show at Club Tochka in Moscow, Russia on October 4, 2008.
Perpetual Black Second
Bleed
Humiliative
Stengah
The Mouth Licking What You've Bled
Electric Red
Suffer In Truth
Rational Gaze
Pravus
Straws Pulled At Random
Future Breed Machine
Soul Burn (Encore)

Tour dates

 
 Meshuggah missed their date at the Whiskey Nightclub, with the official story that they did not have their paperwork in order and they were delayed trying to cross the border into Canada.

References
Meshuggah official tour dates archive from January 12, 2009 (link 1, archive from January 12, 2009 (link 1, link 2)

External links
 Official website
 Meshuggah at MySpace

2008 concert tours
2009 concert tours
Meshuggah concert tours
Concert tours of Europe
Concert tours of North America